Metacatharsius is a genus of dung beetles in the tribe Coprini (subfamily Scarabaeinae) of the scarab family. It comprises more than 60 species from Africa; one is also found in Arabia, and Pakistan.

Habitat
These dung beetles are found mainly in savanna with deep sandy soils.

References

External links

Metacatharsius in Insectoid.Info has a list of species.

Scarabaeidae genera
Coprini